Lotus mollis is a species of legume in the family Fabaceae. It is found only in Yemen. Its natural habitat is rocky areas.

References

mollis
Endemic flora of Socotra
Vulnerable plants
Taxonomy articles created by Polbot
Taxa named by Isaac Bayley Balfour